"Gold" is a song by American country music singer Dierks Bentley. It was released on August 8, 2022, as the first single and partial title track to Bentley's tenth studio album Gravel & Gold.

History
Tom Roland of Billboard wrote that the song is "a return to an increasingly familiar theme in his work: the importance of living in the moment, rather than worrying about the future or fretting about the past." Bentley wrote the song during a songwriting session with Ashley Gorley, Ross Copperman, and Luke Dick. Dick presented the other writers with a "two-chord guitar pattern". Taking inspiration from his own pickup truck, Bentley came up with the song's central idea of contrasting gravel and gold. Bentley and Copperman produced the final recording of the song with assistance from Jon Randall and F. Reid Shippen. Contributing musicians on the track include Bryan Sutton, Sam Bush, and Charlie Worsham.

Music video
Bentley released a video for the song on October 31, 2022.

Chart performance

References

2022 singles
2022 songs 
Capitol Records Nashville singles
Dierks Bentley songs
Songs written by Dierks Bentley
Songs written by Ross Copperman
Songs written by Luke Dick
Songs written by Ashley Gorley